This is a timeline documenting the events of heavy metal in 2002.

Newly formed bands
3,14...
Adrift
All Ends
All Shall Perish
Alltheniko
Angtoria
Arkona 
Asesino
Astral Doors
Audrey Horne
Augury 
Avian
Bilocate 
Bleed the Sky
Bloodsimple
Brand New Sin
Brides of Destruction
Code
Crazy Lixx
Delain 
Despised Icon
DevilDriver
Drudkh
Eluveitie
Epica 
Exmortus
Flyleaf  
Gama Bomb  
Heidevolk 
In Solitude
Iron Mask
Kivimetsän Druidi
Krux
Lethian Dreams
Midnattsol
Minsk 
Misery Signals
Nemesea
Obscura 
OSI 
Psyopus 
Red  
The Saddest Landscape
Sonic Syndicate
Star One 
Sturmgeist
Suicide Silence
Symphony in Peril
Teräsbetoni
The Absence
Theocracy
Torture Killer
Vektor 
Velvet Revolver
Winds of Plague
Violator 
Woods of Ypres
Zonaria

Reformed bands
 Down
 Prong
 Trouble
 Whitesnake

Albums

 3 Inches of Blood - Battlecry Under a Winter Sun
 36 Crazyfists - Bitterness the Star
 The Acacia Strain - ...And Life Is Very Long
 Agalloch - The Mantle
 All That Remains - Behind Silence and Solitude
 Amon Amarth - Versus the World
 Arghoslent - Incorrigible Bigotry
 Anvil – Still Going Strong
 Atreyu - Suicide Notes and Butterfly Kisses
 Avantasia - The Metal Opera Part II
 Bathory - Nordland I
 Behemoth - Zos Kia Cultus (Here and Beyond)
 Beseech - Souls Highway
 Between the Buried and Me – Between the Buried and Me
 Black Label Society - 1919 Eternal
 Black Sabbath - Past Lives (live)
 Blind Guardian - A Night at the Opera
 Bloodbath - Resurrection Through Carnage
 Bolt Thrower – Honour – Valour – Pride
 Bon Jovi - Bounce
 Breaking Benjamin - Saturate
 Cathedral - The VIIth Coming
 Cannibal Corpse - Gore Obsessed
 Chevelle - Wonder What's Next
 Coal Chamber - Dark Days
 Cog - Just Visiting Part One (EP)
 Cog - Just Visiting Part Two (EP)
 Crazy Town - Darkhorse
 Danzig – Danzig 777: I Luciferi
 Dark Tranquillity - Damage Done
 Decapitated – Nihility
 Demon Hunter – Demon Hunter
 Despised Icon - Consumed by Your Poison
 Def Leppard - X
 The Dillinger Escape Plan - Irony Is a Dead Scene (EP)
 Dio - Killing the Dragon
 Disturbed - Believe
 Down - Down II: A Bustle in Your Hedgerow
 Dream Evil - Dragonslayer                                          
 Dream Theater - Six Degrees of Inner Turbulence
 Electric Wizard – Let Us Prey
 Fear Factory - Concrete (originally recorded in 1991, but not released until 2002)
 Finch – What It Is to Burn
 Firewind – Between Heaven and Hell
 Freak Kitchen - Move
 HammerFall - Crimson Thunder
 Hardline - II
 Hatebreed - Perseverance
 Hate Eternal - King of All Kings
 Heaven Shall Burn – Whatever It May Take
 High on Fire – Surrounded by Thieves
 Immolation - Unholy Cult
 Immortal - Sons of Northern Darkness
 In Flames - Reroute to Remain
 Iron Savior - Condition Red
 Isis - Oceanic
 Kataklysm - Shadows & Dust
 Killswitch Engage - Alive or Just Breathing
 King Diamond - Abigail II: The Revenge
 Korn - Untouchables
 Krux - Krux
 Kylesa - Kylesa
 Lacuna Coil - Comalies
 Lordi - Get Heavy
 Luca Turilli - Prophet of the Last Eclipse
 Manowar - Warriors of the World
 Mastodon - Remission
 Megadeth - Rude Awakening (live)
 Megadeth - Still Alive... and Well? (compilation)
 Mercenary - Everblack
 Meshuggah - Nothing
 Motörhead - Hammered
 Nightwish - Century Child
 Nine Inch Nails - And All That Could Have Been (live)
 Norma Jean - Bless the Martyr and Kiss the Child
 Opeth - Deliverance
 Orange Goblin – Coup de Grace
 Origin – Informis Infinitas Inhumanitas
 Otep - Sevas Tra
 Pagan's Mind - Celestial Entrance
 Pain - Nothing Remains the Same
 Papa Roach - Lovehatetragedy
 Pitchshifter - PSI
 Poison the Well - Tear from the Red
 Power Quest - Wings of Forever
 Primal Fear - Black Sun
 Pro-Pain – Shreds of Dignity
 Protest the Hero - A Calculated Use of Sound
 QueenAdreena - Drink Me
 Raunchy - Velvet Noise
 The Red Chord – Fused Together in Revolving Doors
 Rhapsody - Power of the Dragonflame
 Rotting Christ - Genesis
 Rush - Vapor Trails
 Sacrificium – Cold Black Piece of Flesh
 Satyricon - Volcano
 Saxon - Heavy Metal Thunder
 Sentenced - The Cold White Light
 Seven Witches – Xiled to Infinity and One
 Shadows Fall - The Art of Balance
 Sinergy - Suicide by My Side
 Slechtvalk - The War That Plagues the Lands
 Soilwork - Natural Born Chaos
 Sonata Arctica - Songs of Silence - Live in Tokyo (live)
 Soulfly - 3
 Spectre Dragon - Under Hell's Command
 Star One - Space Metal
 Stone Sour - Stone Sour
 SugarComa - Becoming Something Else
 Symphony X - The Odyssey
 System of a Down - Steal This Album!
 Theory of a Deadman - Theory of a Deadman
 Threshold - Critical Mass
 Trapt - Trapt
 Týr - How Far to Asgaard
 Underoath – The Changing of Times
 Vader – Revelations
 Vanden Plas - Beyond Daylight
 Vintersorg - Visions from the Spiral Generator
 Visions of Atlantis - Eternal Endless Infinity
 WarCry - WarCry
 WarCry - El Sello de los Tiempos
 Winds - Reflections of the I
 Whispering Gallery – Lost as One

Disbandments
 Alice in Chains
 Breach
 Fear Factory
 Godflesh
 Lifer
 Megadeth

Events
 Alice in Chains singer Layne Staley is found dead from an overdose of heroin.
 HIV-stricken former Ratt guitarist Robbin Crosby dies from a heroin overdose.
 Megadeth frontman Dave Mustaine disbands the band after severely injuring his arm leaving him unable to play.
 Ex-Iron Maiden drummer Clive Burr is diagnosed with multiple sclerosis.
 Drowning Pool singer Dave Williams dies on Wednesday August 14, 2002. He was found inside his tour bus, dead of cardiomyopathy.
 Dave Lombardo rejoins Slayer.
 Tarot bassist Marko Hietala leaves Sinergy and joins Nightwish as their new bassist.
 Guitarist Jeff Phillips joins Kittie as a session member, replacing Fallon Bowman. Bassist Talena Atfield quits and is replaced by Jennifer Arroyo.
 Mötley Crüe drummer Randy Castillo dies of cancer.

References 

2000s in heavy metal music
Metal